Bara is a village of Dildarnagar Kamsar in Ghazipur district in the Indian state of Uttar Pradesh. It is situated on the banks of the holy river Ganges.

The majority of the residents are Muslim (Pathan). The village has a cricket team named Bara Cricket Club and a football team named Bara Football Club.

There is an English medium school named IQRA model school (managed by Muslim welfare and trust) and a college named Bara Inter College. As of 2011 census the main population of Bara lived in an area of 410 acres and had 2988 households. Bara is famous for horse racing. Every year nearly 500 participants attend. The race is done with fifty horses.

History 

According to the old books and sayings it is said that the Bara village was established by the family Cherus. Tikam deo was a King of chero Dynasty and a ruler of Birpur estate. Later Kam dev and Dham dev came to this region and Tikam deo Lost the power and Birpur came in direct control of them and later Kamsar jagir. After Tikam deo Lost his estate his descendants name as Rajdhar Rai, Mukund Rai, and Pithaur Rai out of three brothers, one brother settled at Birpur, and one brother established Narayanpur and Ujjar villages. Later their family established many villages near Birpur.

One brother adopted Islam in 1610 on getting influenced by a Sufi Saint and established bara. The brother who adopted Islam and his descendants were in a good relationship from Kamsar because of which many Kamsar pathans settled at Bara and family from bara settled in different villages of Kamsar. Originally the land on which bara stands belonged to the family of Kamsaar. But later the brother who adopted Islam married a daughter of a zamindar in Kamsaar in 1614 (who lived at Mania as of sayings) and the zamindar gifted 13,000 Bighas (32.8531 km2) of land (as of sayings) on the banks of Karamasa and Ganges to him and then he established Bara. Bara was also a pargana of Kamsaar Raj. At Birpur, Where one brother In the Mughal period and subsequently to the British Imperialism, it lies on an important route of Delhi to Kolkata, and there were constant movement of businessmen and traders.

The village has a railway station known as Bara kalan station. During Mughals the Bara was also a trade centre because of its distance from the ganga river. An old port in Bara was built in the early 1600s. Bara witnessed the Battle of Chausa, a military engagement between the Mughal Emperor Humayun, and the Pathan Sher Shah Suri, fought on 26 June 1539, 2 km away.

Historical Population of Bara
Before 1857 many soldiers of Kamsaar Raj with their family also lived at Bara but later many of them migrated to Bihar or cities from the village because of which population of Bara and Dildarnagar Kamsar decreased.

Agriculture

Agriculture is the main employment in the village. More than 2500 acres of land are used for agriculture. All kinds of machinery like tractors, combine harvesters, balers etc. are used in the village. The village has a good water supply for irrigation purposes. Most people have their own tube wells or other things for irrigation. The village is near to Dildarnagar and Chausa which are some of the main markets for agriculture. The village is surrounded by two river name as Karmanasa and Ganges. The soil of the village is good for farming. All kinds of crops which are grown in Purvanchal and Buxar district are grown in the village.

Watermelon is grown at a large scale in the village as Ganges river passes about 4.8 kilometres from the village. The village has many ponds.

Demography

Notable People From Bara

How to reach Bara
Barakalan Halt RailWay Station, Gahmar RailWay Station, Dildarnagar junction and Buxar junction are the closest railway stations to Bara. The nearest airport is in Varanasi, Lal Bahadur Shastri International Airport and Sri Rajendra Nagar Patna Airport.

References 

Villages in Ghazipur district
Towns and villages in Kamsar